The 2013–14 California Golden Bears women's basketball team will represent University of California, Berkeley during the 2013–14 NCAA Division I women's basketball season. The Golden Bears, led by third year head coach Lindsay Gottlieb, played their home games at the Haas Pavilion and were members of the Pac-12 Conference. They finished with a record of 22–10 overall, 13–5 in Pac-12 play for a tie for a second-place finish. They lost in the quarterfinals in the 2014 Pac-12 Conference women's basketball tournament to Washington State. They were invited to the 2014 NCAA Division I women's basketball tournament which they defeated Fordham in the first round before getting defeated by Baylor in the second round.

Roster

Schedule

|-
!colspan=9 | Exhibition

|-
!colspan=9| Regular Season

|-
!colspan=9 | 2014 Pac-12 Conference women's tournament

|-
!colspan=9 | NCAA women's tournament

Source

Rankings

See also
 2013–14 California Golden Bears men's basketball team

References

California Golden Bears women's basketball seasons
California
California
Golden Bear
Golden Bear